Remšnik is a dispersed settlement in the hills northeast of Radlje ob Dravi in Slovenia.

The parish church in the settlement is dedicated to Saint George and belongs to the Roman Catholic Archdiocese of Maribor. It was built on the foundations of a late Gothic church dating to 1532 after a fire in 1863 completely destroyed the original building. It is a single-nave church with a belfry on its western facade.

References

External links

Remšnik on Geopedia

Populated places in the Municipality of Radlje ob Dravi